Clisson Sèvre et Maine Agglo is the communauté d'agglomération, an intercommunal structure, centred on the town of Clisson. It is located in the Loire-Atlantique department, in the Pays de la Loire region, western France. Created in 2017, its seat is in Clisson. Its area is 309.6 km2. Its population was 56,135 in 2019, of which 7,435 in Clisson proper.

Composition
The communauté d'agglomération consists of the following 16 communes:

Aigrefeuille-sur-Maine
Boussay
Château-Thébaud
Clisson
Gétigné
Gorges
La Haie-Fouassière
Haute-Goulaine
Maisdon-sur-Sèvre
Monnières
La Planche
Remouillé
Saint-Fiacre-sur-Maine
Saint-Hilaire-de-Clisson
Saint-Lumine-de-Clisson
Vieillevigne

References

Clisson
Clisson